Naomi Pomeroy, born in Corvallis, Oregon, in 1974, is a professional chef and restaurateur. In an interview, Pomeroy explains that she began cooking at the age of three and created her first recipe at the age of four. She graduated from Lewis & Clark College in 1997 with a degree in history. Pomeroy has no formal culinary or business training; she developed her skills by watching other food-industry professionals. In 2007, she opened the restaurant Beast in Portland, Oregon. Previously, she started Gotham Tavern, Gotham Coffee shop, and ClarkLewis restaurant with Michael Hebb. In 2013, Working Mother magazine featured an article which details Pomeroy's experiences as a working single parent.

Professional history
In 2009, Pomeroy was listed by Food & Wine magazine as one of America's Top 10 Best New Chefs. As a restaurateur, she was recognized in the October 2010 issue of Marie Claire as one of the 18 Most Powerful Women in Business. O, The Oprah Magazine mentions her career endeavors and named her as one of the Top 10 Women on the Rise for 2010. In 2014, Pomeroy won the James Beard Foundation Award for Best Chef Northwest.

In 2010, Pomeroy appeared on Iron Chef and lost to Chef Jose Garces. Her television appearances also include serving as a 2014 guest judge on the television series Knife Fight. Pomeroy also spoke at a TedxPortland Talk in 2013.

Pomeroy is scheduled to publish her first cookbook in 2016 with Ten Speed Press. According to Publishers Weekly, the cookbook would be titled Oui: Lessons from an Award-Winning Self-Taught Chef. Pomeroy's cookbook, released in 2016, was entitled Taste & Technique: Recipes to Elevate Your Home Cooking.

Her restaurant, Beast, closed in 2020 during the COVID-19 pandemic, and Pomeroy now uses the space for a new venture called Ripe Cooperative, a marketplace that also sells meal boxes for customers to finish at home.

See also
 James Beard Foundation Award: 2010s

References

External links
 Food Diplomacy
 Kitchen Diplomacy
 Restaurant Review

American chefs
1974 births
Living people
People from Corvallis, Oregon
Lewis & Clark College alumni